This is a list of singles that charted in the top ten of the ARIA Charts in 2010.

Top-ten singles

Key

2009 peaks

2011 peaks

Entries by artist
The following table shows artists who achieved two or more top 10 entries in 2010, including songs that reached their peak in 2009 and 2011. The figures include both main artists and featured artists. The total number of weeks an artist spent in the top ten in 2010 is also shown.

See also
2010 in music
ARIA Charts
List of number-one singles of 2010 (Australia)
List of top 25 singles for 2010 in Australia

References 

2010 in Australian music
Australia Top 10
Top 10 singles 2010